General Güemes is the largest and the northernmost department of Chaco Province in Argentina.

The provincial subdivision has a population of about 62,000 inhabitants in an area of  25,487 km², and its capital city is Juan José Castelli, which is located around 1,305 km from the Capital federal.

Settlements

Castelli
Colonia La Florida
El Espinillo
El Pintado
Fortín Lavalle
Kilometro 642
Miraflores
Nueva Población
Nueva Pompeya
Palo Marcado
San Juancito
Simbolar
Tunales
Zaparinqui

References

External links
J.J. Castelli Municipal Website (Spanish)
Juan José Castelli Website

Departments of Chaco Province